Maarten van der Want (born 15 January 1995) is a Dutch footballer who plays as a goalkeeper for Italian  club Olbia.

Career statistics

Club

Notes

References

External links
 

1995 births
Living people
Footballers from Delft
Dutch footballers
Association football goalkeepers
ADO Den Haag players
Serie C players
Serie D players
Virtus Entella players
Olbia Calcio 1905 players
Dutch expatriate footballers
Dutch expatriate sportspeople in Italy
Expatriate footballers in Italy